Vanderbilt Avenue station may refer to:
 Vanderbilt Avenue (BMT Fulton Street Line), a station on the demolished BMT Fulton Street Line
 Vanderbilt Avenue (BMT Myrtle Avenue Line), a station on the demolished BMT Myrtle Avenue Line